The 2004 Saskatchewan Scott Tournament of Hearts women's provincial curling championship, was held January 28 to February 1 at the Meadow Lake Civic Centre in Meadow Lake, Saskatchewan. The winning team of Sherry Anderson, represented Saskatchewan at the 2004 Scott Tournament of Hearts in Red Deer, Alberta, where the team finished round robin with a  7-4 record, missing out on the playoffs, after losing a tiebreaker to Manitoba's Lois Fowler.

Teams

 Sherry Anderson
 Jan Betker
 Amber Holland
 Stefanie Miller
 Patty Rocheleau
 Chantelle Seiferling
 Cindy Street
 Delores Syrota

Standings

Tiebreaker 1

Tiebreaker 2

Playoffs

References

Saskatchewan Scotties Tournament Of Hearts, 2004
Meadow Lake, Saskatchewan